Matheolus may refer to:

Mathieu of Boulogne, French poet 
Matheolus Perusinus, aka Matheolus of Perugia